The 2016–17 Women's Big Bash League season or WBBL|02 was the second season of the Women's Big Bash League (WBBL), the semi-professional women's Twenty20 domestic cricket competition in Australia. The tournament ran from 10 December 2016 to 28 January 2017.

The Sydney Sixers finished the round-robin stage of the tournament in first place and, despite a late-season injury to captain Ellyse Perry, went on to claim their maiden championship. In the final, held at the WACA, Sydney defeated the Perth Scorchers by seven runs in a "veritable classic". Sixers medium-pace bowler Sarah Aley was named Player of the Final, managing figures of 4/23 in the decider and also clinching the title of WBBL|02 leading wicket-taker.

Brisbane Heat wicket-keeper Beth Mooney was named Player of the Tournament, while Melbourne Stars captain Meg Lanning topped the leading run-scorer table for the second-straight season.

Teams 
Each squad featured 15 active players, with an allowance of up to five marquee signings including a maximum of three from overseas. Australian marquees were defined as players who made at least ten limited-overs appearances for the national team between 1 July 2013 and 1 July 2016.

The table below lists each team's marquee players and other key details for the season.

Personnel changes

Local players 
The table below lists local player movements made ahead of the season.

Overseas players 
The table below lists changes to overseas marquee allocations made ahead of the season.

Changes made during the season included:

England marquee Lauren Winfield returned to the Brisbane Heat as a replacement player.
Ireland marquee Isobel Joyce signed with the Hobart Hurricanes as a replacement player.
England marquee Danielle Hazell signed with the Melbourne Stars as a replacement player.
England marquee Rebecca Grundy signed with the Perth Scorchers as a replacement player.
England marquee Amy Jones signed with the Sydney Sixers as a replacement player.

Leadership 
Captaincy changes made ahead of the season included:

Tegan McPharlin was appointed captain of the Adelaide Strikers, replacing Lauren Ebsary (6–8 win–loss record).
Rachel Priest was appointed captain of the Melbourne Renegades, replacing Sarah Elliott (3–7 win–loss record).
Suzie Bates was appointed captain of the Perth Scorchers, replacing Nicole Bolton (7–8 win–loss record).

Captaincy changes made during the season included:

Kirby Short assumed the captaincy of the Brisbane Heat, replacing Delissa Kimmince (11–11 win–loss record).
Kristen Beams stood in as acting captain of the Melbourne Stars for one game, replacing Meg Lanning who was sidelined with a hamstring injury.

Points table

Win–loss table 
Below is a summary of results for each team's fourteen regular season matches, plus finals where applicable, in chronological order. A team's opponent for any given match is listed above the margin of victory/defeat.

Fixtures
Format of the group stage was a double round-robin tournament, with teams playing each other twice. Some matches were played in neutral cities as a result of occasional carnival weekends where as many as all eight teams were scheduled at the same venue. There were 14 double header fixtures with the men's Big Bash League, and the semi-finals and final were also played as a double header.

Week 1

Week 2

Week 3

Week 4

Week 5

Week 6

Week 7

Knockout phase

Semi-finals

Final

Statistics

Highest totals

Most runs

Most wickets

Awards

Player of the tournament
Player of the Tournament votes are awarded on a 3-2-1 basis by the two standing umpires at the conclusion of every match, meaning a player can receive a maximum of six votes per game.

Source: WBBL|02 Player of the tournament

Team of the tournament
An honorary XI recognising the standout performers of WBBL|02 was named by bigbash.com.au:
 Meg Lanning (Melbourne Stars)
 Beth Mooney (Brisbane Heat)
 Ellyse Perry (Sydney Sixers)
 Ashleigh Gardner (Sydney Sixers)
 Sophie Devine (Adelaide Strikers)
 Jess Jonassen (Brisbane Heat)
 Katherine Brunt (Perth Scorchers)
 Marizanne Kapp (Sydney Sixers)
 Sarah Aley (Sydney Sixers)
 Kristen Beams (Melbourne Stars)
 Molly Strano (Melbourne Renegades)

Young gun award 
Players under 21 years of age at the start of the season are eligible for the Young Gun Award. Weekly winners are selected over the course of the season by a panel of Cricket Australia officials based on match performance, on-field and off-field attitude, and their demonstration of skill, tenacity and good sportsmanship. Each weekly winner receives a $500 Rebel gift card and the overall winner receives a $5000 cash prize, as well as access to a learning and mentor program.

The nominees for the WBBL|02 Young Gun were:
 Week 1: Sophie Molineux (Melbourne Renegades)
 Week 2: Ashleigh Gardner (Sydney Sixers) – winner
 Week 3: Tahlia McGrath (Adelaide Strikers)
 Week 4: Heather Graham (Perth Scorchers)
 Week 5: Lauren Smith (Sydney Sixers)
 Week 6: Jemma Barsby (Brisbane Heat)
 Week 7: Amanda-Jade Wellington (Adelaide Strikers)

Sydney Sixers all-rounder Ashleigh Gardner was named the Young Gun of WBBL|02, having scored 414 runs with the bat and claiming ten wickets with the ball throughout the season.

"Player of the match" tally
The table below shows the number of Player of the Match awards won by each player throughout the season. The career tally indicates the number of awards won by a player throughout her entire time in the league at the conclusion of the season, including awards won while previously playing for a different WBBL team.

Audience
There was greater television coverage than the previous season, with twelve games aired live by Network Ten, including four stand-alone games on the opening weekend. This included the Sydney Thunder vs Melbourne Stars match, which was shown on Network Ten's primary channel during prime time—a first for a stand-alone women's sporting match in Australia. The remaining 47 games were streamed live through Cricket Australia's Live app and Website, and the WBBL Facebook page.

Below are the Australian television ratings for the season.

References

Notes

Further reading

Notes

External links
Series home at ESPNcricinfo

 
Women's Big Bash League seasons
!
Women's Big Bash League